Carnets de scène (Eng: Memories) is an album recorded by the French artist Patricia Kaas. It was her first live album, and her third album overall. Recorded during the Scène de vie tour, Kaas' first concerts tour, and released in 1991, the album was successful, particularly in France, and was also re-issued as DVD in 2004.

Background 

After the huge success of her first two studio albums, Kaas decided to perform a series of concerts across the world : the Scène de vie tour. There were 210 concerts, 650,000 spectators in 13 countries, including Japan, Canada and the USSR, where she sang in Moscow and Leningrad. It was recorded across two days between May 12 and 19, 1990, at Zénith of Paris (France).

The album contains many songs from Mademoiselle chante... and Scène de vie, plus a few new songs, such as "Lily Marlène". The hits "Mademoiselle chante le blues" and "Quand Jimmy dit" were performed in an extended version.
The original double CD included 20 tracks; the single CD issue includes the 16 tracks listed below.

About 13 years later, the label Sony BMG also published the album as a live DVD.

Chart performances 

The CD went straight to #8, its peak position, on December 6, 1991, on the French SNEP Albums Chart. It remained for only two weeks in the top ten and 16 weeks in the top 40. It achieved double gold four years after its release.

The album was less successful in Germany (#53) and Switzerland (#40), where it stayed in the low positions.

Track listing 

 CD

 DVD

Same track listing

Personnel 

 Management : Talent Sorcier (Cyril Prieur, Richard Walter)
 Production : Gérard Drouot productions, Note de blues
 Production director : Jean-Hugues Feugeas
 Musical direction : Claude Samard, Patriciens and her vocalists
 Bass, percussion : Noël Assolo
 Bass, saxophone : Philippe Gonnand
 Guitar : Jean-Pierre Taieb
 Drum kit : Jean-Claude Givoine (+ electronic drum kit), Christophe Deschamps, Pascal Reva
 Keyboards : Benoît Sourisse (+ harmonica), Michel Amsellem, Yves Ottino
 Background vocals : Slim Batteux, Jacques Mercier
 Sound engineer and mixing : Bruno Lambert
 Artistic production : Jean-Jacques Souplet
 Recorded at Studio Le Voyageur II
 Mixed at Studio Marcadet
 Photo on the cover : Bernard Levy
 Photos in the booklet : B.Auger, F.Garcia, C.Gassian, B.Leloup, B.Levy, M.Marizi, Naoki, B.Pierrat, P.Riedinger, S.Rubinstein, P.Terrasson, F.Vernhet, X
 Design : Antonietti, Pascault & Ass.

Charts

Weekly charts

Year-end charts

Certifications and sales

References 

Patricia Kaas albums
1991 live albums
Columbia Records live albums